The 8th (Rhenish) Cuirassiers “Count Geßler” were a heavy cavalry regiment of the Royal Prussian Army. The regiment was formed in 1815. The regiment fought in the Austro-Prussian War, the Franco-Prussian War and  World War I. The regiment was disbanded in 1919.

The British King George V was appointed Colonel-in-Chief of the Regiment in January 1902, during a visit to Berlin when he was still Prince of Wales. He served as such until the two countries declared war in 1914.

See also
List of Imperial German cavalry regiments

References

Cuirassiers of the Prussian Army
Military units and formations established in 1815
Military units and formations disestablished in 1919
1815 establishments in Prussia